Serafin is a rock band from London who formed and began playing in September 2000 until quietly disbanding in the late 2000s after the release of their second album.  They returned to release a new album in 2020.

History 
The original band lineup didn't play live but the two members who have stayed throughout are Ben Fox Smith, and Darryn Harkness. The band itself was formed after the demise of Stony Sleep when Ben met Darryn at a Eurovision Song Contest party in Highbury, London. Darryn played on some John Peel Sessions before forming Serafin. They added Johnny Borrell (bass) and then Stuart Quinnell with Richie Mills (drums) from Cable. These line-ups were short lived (a few months) and their first gig had Ronny Growler on drums and Mike Clark on bass.

Stuart Quinnell appears to be the bass tech for Frankie Poullain from The Darkness and plays in the road crew band Onion Trump.

Mike Clark left to go back to Canada in 2002 and is now working on Ben Smith's acoustic-electronic solo project Young Sawbones. He was replaced by Ben Ellis who had been playing for Catherine Wheel who had decided to call it a day. It was this line-up on their debut album No Push Collide.

On 26 August 2004 Serafin posted this note on their website: "We have replaced our drummer Ronny Growler with a guy called Lonely Blue boy. We love Ronny who is a fantastic drummer in his own right, but have had to realise our musical differences and preferences which, while considering the chemistry of the band and its future, became too great to continue with." Not too soon later did they announce that they had returned to the studio for their second album.

The new drummer was Ben's brother Shian Smith-Pancorvo who had left Razorlight in March 2004.

Famous fans include Simon Pegg of Spaced and Craig Nicholls of The Vines.

On 23 October 2007, Serafin announced their new bassist: Daniel Green 24 from Reading band Radios in Motion who replaces Ben Ellis.

Releases 
Although the band has been around for a few years, only two full albums have been released, No Push Collide (2003) on Taste Media, and To The Teeth (2007) on Our Rekords. They were produced by Dave Sardy in Los Angeles. and Ian Caple in London.

Two singles were released before the album, Things Fall Apart and Day by Day.

Serafin have released two four track EPs, also on Taste Media before No Push Collide. The first was in April, 2002, the second in August, 2002.

Taste Media was bought by Warner Music Group in 2004 which forced the band into legal limbo with no way to get out of their contract and no funding to promote To The Teeth. The management was fired and all four members spent more time on side projects (New Telepathics, French Car And The Bulimic Wizards, Young Sawbones and Triggerbox).

At the start of May 2005, Ben began releasing acoustic MP3s on their site, culminating in 21 ideas for songs free for download. The recording quality varies due to the nature of four-track recordings. They now have rough mixes of non-acoustic tracks on their Myspace page.

The Second album, 'To The Teeth', was released in December 2007, under their new record label 'Our Rekords'.

Discography

Albums

Singles

EPs

Compilations

X-Ray CD 05 - Build High, Tear Low (Track 8) X-Ray, June 2003
All Areas Volume 41 - No Happy (Track 2) Visions Magazine, July 2003
X-Rock #01 - Thing Fall Apart (Track 4) X-Rock, 2003
Peoplesound: Special Edition 4 - Day By Day (Track 1) PeopleSound, 2003

Appearances 
They sold the most records in France on Naïve Records, 20,000 or so. They toured extensively playing the Reading and Leeds Festivals twice, once on the Carling Stage (2002) and once on the Radio 1 stage (2003). 
Played many festivals in other European countries and supported Frank Black, Muse and Feeder, on their tour in 2003 before the release of No Push Collide.

Their single Day By Day appeared on the Madden NFL 2004 video game.

There's a hype around the founding members Darryn and Ben Smith, which is evident in one song, they are both vegan.

External links 
Official Homepage
DrownedInSound (Interview, News)
Live Photos

English rock music groups
Musical groups from London
Naïve Records artists